Top Authority is an American hip hop trio from Flint, Michigan, composed of rappers Dia "Shotgun" Peacock, Diallo "Flex" Peacock and producer David "DaLo" Hornaday. They were one of the first rap groups from Flint and among the earliest of the underground Midwest hip hop scene to release a nationally recognized album. Bootleg, a member of the slightly later Flint group The Dayton Family, told Murder Dog magazine, "We grew up together, same hood. We'd be together every day. That's family". He lists them as leading lights in Flint music, along with acts like Ready for the World and MC Breed. Rapper Chilla Pertilla defined Northern hip hop to Murderdog as "Eminem, Twista, Bone, Breed, Dayton Family, Top Authority, Esham, and ICP".

They first came to public attention with the single "93 (Things Ain't How They Should Be)" from their debut album Something to Blaze To. The "rolling g-funk trio" (as John Bush of AllMusic described members Shotgun, Flex and DaLo) followed up with Rated G, their sophomore album in 1995. It featured scratches from DJ Aladdin and reached #144 on the Billboard 200 albums chart in the United States. AllMusic considers 1997's Top Authority Uncut (The New Yea) to be their best release. It peaked at #192 on the Billboard 200, spawning the single "World War III" charting at #37 on Billboard Hot Rap Songs. In 2009, Top Authority returned with their fourth album, Kush Music, on which MC Breed and Do or Die made guest appearances.

Discography

Albums

Singles

References

External links
Top Authority on iTunes

African-American musical groups
American hip hop groups
Midwest hip hop groups
Musical groups from Flint, Michigan
American musical trios
Gangsta rap groups